Nothing Stays the Same Forever (The Best of Hush Volume One) is the first greatest hits album by Australian glam rock group Hush, although some of the tracks were re-recorded. The album was released in November 1976 peaked at No. 57 and was certified gold on the Australian charts.

Track listing

Charts

References 

1976 compilation albums
Hush (band) albums
Compilation albums by Australian artists